Thomas J. Haggerty (died January 14, 1956) was an American college basketball coach. He coached DePaul University to a record of 64–29 from 1936 to 1940, and after a stint in the United States Army, returned to the school in 1944 to become its athletic director. From 1945 to 1950, he coached Loyola University Chicago to a record of 111–41, and guided them to a second-place finish in the 1949 National Invitation Tournament. He later coached at Loyola University New Orleans, but resigned during the 1953–54 season because of health issues. He died of pneumonia at age 51 on January 14, 1956.

References
 
 

Year of birth missing
1956 deaths
American men's basketball coaches
Deaths from pneumonia in Louisiana
DePaul Blue Demons athletic directors
DePaul Blue Demons men's basketball coaches
Loyola Ramblers athletic directors
Loyola Ramblers men's basketball coaches
Loyola Wolf Pack men's basketball coaches